Abacetus usagarensis is a species of ground beetle in the subfamily Pterostichinae. It was described by Ancey in 1882.

References

usagarensis
Beetles described in 1882